Another Sound Is Dying is the third studio album by Dub Trio. It was released on Ipecac Recordings on January 29, 2008. "No Flag" features Mike Patton on vocals.

Critical reception

At Metacritic, which assigns a weighted average score out of 100 to reviews from mainstream critics, the album received an average score of 70, based on 5 reviews, indicating "generally favorable reviews".

Phil Freeman of AllMusic described the album as "a solid introduction to Dub Trio for newcomers" and "a welcome continuation of their journey into the space between metal and dub for existing fans." Chris Catania of PopMatters said, "The way Dub Trio utilize dub as a starting point and a foundation is alluring by itself, but, again, the avenues they explore and how they methodically incorporate trance-inducing melodies makes this a prime blueprint for anyone who wants to attempt creating a new sound."

Track listing

Personnel
Credits adapted from liner notes.

Dub Trio
 Stu Brooks – bass guitar, instruments, gadgets, production, mixing
 DP Holmes – guitar, instruments, gadgets, production, mixing
 Joe Tomino – drums, instruments, gadgets, production, mixing

Additional personnel
 Mike Patton – vocals (on "No Flag")
 Joel Hamilton – production, executive production, engineering, mixing
 Joseph Yoon – executive production
 Marc Goodman – engineering assistance
 Fred Kevorkian – mastering
 Martin Kvamme – artwork

References

External links
 

2008 albums
Dub Trio albums
Ipecac Recordings albums